The 2010 season of the State League Premier Division ran from 20 March to 2 October, featuring 12 clubs.

Western Knights were the Premiers – their fourth title – and Perth were Champions.

Pre-season changes

League table

Finals

References

Soccer in Western Australia
2010 in Australian soccer